The ibises (collective plural ibis; classical plurals ibides and ibes) are a group of long-legged wading birds in the family Threskiornithidae, that inhabit wetlands, forests and plains. "Ibis" derives from the Latin and Ancient Greek word for this group of birds. It also occurs in the scientific name of the cattle egret (Bubulcus ibis) mistakenly identified in 1757 as being the sacred ibis.

Description
Ibises all have long, downcurved bills, and usually feed as a group, probing mud for food items, usually crustaceans. They are monogamous and highly territorial while nesting and feeding. Most nest in trees, often with spoonbills or herons. All extant species are capable of flight, but two extinct genera were flightless, namely the kiwi-like Apteribis in the Hawaiian Islands, and the peculiar Xenicibis in Jamaica. The word ibis comes from Latin ibis from Greek ἶβις ibis from Egyptian hb, hīb.

Species in taxonomic order
There are 29 extant species and 4 extinct species of ibis.

An extinct species, the Jamaican ibis or clubbed-wing ibis (Xenicibis xympithecus) was uniquely characterized by its club-like wings.

In culture
The African sacred ibis was an object of religious veneration in ancient Egypt, particularly associated with the deity Djehuty or otherwise commonly referred to in Greek as Thoth. He is responsible for writing, mathematics, measurement and time as well as the moon and magic. In artworks of the Late Period of Ancient Egypt, Thoth is popularly depicted as an ibis-headed man in the act of writing. However, Mitogenomic diversity in sacred ibis mummies indicates that ancient Egyptians captured the birds from the wild rather than farming them.

At the town of Hermopolis, ibises were reared specifically for sacrificial purposes and in the Ibis Galleries at Saqqara, archaeologists found the mummies of one and a half million ibises.

According to local legend in the Birecik area, the northern bald ibis was one of the first birds that Noah released from the Ark as a symbol of fertility, and a lingering religious sentiment in Turkey helped the colonies there to survive long after the demise of the species in Europe.

The mascot of the University of Miami is an American white ibis named Sebastian.  The ibis was selected as the school mascot because of its legendary bravery during hurricanes.  According to legend, the ibis is the last of wildlife to take shelter before a hurricane hits and the first to reappear once the storm has passed.

Harvard University's humor magazine, Harvard Lampoon, uses the ibis as its symbol. A copper statue of an ibis is prominently displayed on the roof of the Harvard Lampoon Building at 44 Bow Street.

A short story "The Scarlet Ibis" by James Hurst uses the red bird as foreshadowing for a character's death and as the primary symbol.

The African sacred ibis is the unit symbol of the Israeli Special Forces unit known as Unit 212 or Maglan (Hebrew מגלן).

According to Josephus, Moses used the ibis to help him defeat the Ethiopians.

The Australian white ibis has become a focus of art, pop culture and memes since rapidly adapting to city life in recent decades, and has earned the popular nicknames "bin chicken" and "tip turkey". In December 2017, the ibis placed second in Guardian Australia inaugural Bird of the Year poll, after leading for much of the voting period.

In April 2022, Queensland sports minister Stirling Hinchliffe suggested the ibis as a potential mascot for the 2032 Olympic Games, which are scheduled to be held in Brisbane. Hinchcliffe's suggestion prompted much discussion in the media.

Gallery

Notes

References

External links

Ibis videos – at Internet Bird Collection

 
Threskiornithidae
Taxa named by Franz Poche
Paraphyletic groups